is a Japanese football player, who plays for Kagoshima United FC as a forward.

Career
Kayanuma was chosen as Special Designated Player in July 2015, but in January 2016 he signed a full pro-contract with Kataller Toyama.

Club statistics
Updated to 23 February 2019.

References

External links
Profile at Kagoshima United FC

Profile at Kataller Toyama

1993 births
Living people
Kanto Gakuin University alumni
Association football people from Yamanashi Prefecture
Japanese footballers
J3 League players
Kataller Toyama players
Kagoshima United FC players
Association football forwards